Matías Eduardo Esquivel (born 22 March 1999) is an Argentine professional footballer who plays as a midfielder for Talleres, on loan from Lanús.

Professional career
Esquivel made his professional debut for Lanús in a 1-0 Argentine Primera División win over Racing Club on 8 December 2019.

References

External links
 

1999 births
Living people
Sportspeople from Avellaneda
Argentine footballers
Association football midfielders
Club Atlético Lanús footballers
Talleres de Córdoba footballers
Argentine Primera División players